Sinking Creek is a stream in Lawrence and Dade counties of southwest Missouri. It is a tributary of Turnback Creek.

The stream flows past the southwest edge of Everton and the village of Pilgrim. The St. Louis–San Francisco Railway follows the stream valley.

Sinking Creek was named for its status as a losing stream.

See also
List of rivers of Missouri

References

Rivers of Dade County, Missouri
Rivers of Lawrence County, Missouri
Rivers of Missouri